Federal elections were held in Belgium on 18 May 2003, the first under a new electoral code. One of the novelties was an electoral threshold of 5%, which has cost many seats to the N-VA and the Green parties, Ecolo and Agalev. The Belgian Socialists recovered well; the liberal and nationalist parties increased their vote as well.

The Flemish Greens lost all their seats. The Greens were attacked on two fronts: some, including their coalition partners, accused them of being too fundamentalist, while others said that they had betrayed their ideals. The resignation of a Walloon green minister (Isabelle Durant), one week before the elections, probably didn't do them much good either. Although it was predicted in some opinion polls, the gains of the Front National were surprising, considering that it seldom appeared in the media. The most important trend was the recovery of the Flemish social-democrats, led by the popular (some would say populist) Steve Stevaert. The fact that Elio Di Rupo was learning Dutch caused rumours that he hoped to become prime minister, if the social-democrats would turn out to be the largest political family.

Themes that probably influenced the election results in some way or another were the government's opposition to the 2003 invasion of Iraq, the controversy around the nuisance around the airport of Zaventem, the controversy surrounding the banning of tobacco publicity, and unemployment, but a general dominating theme was lacking.

Results

Chamber of Representatives

Senate

Further reading 
 

Federal
Federal elections in Belgium
May 2003 events in Europe